Henry Harrison "Tip" Aplin (April 15, 1841 – July 23, 1910) was an American Civil War veteran, businessman, and politician from the U.S. state of Michigan. He served one term in the United States House of Representatives from 1901 to 1903.

Early life and military career
Aplin was born in Thetford Township, Michigan, and moved with his parents to Flint in 1848 where he attended the public schools. In the American Civil War, he enlisted on July 3, 1861, in Company C, Sixteenth Regiment, Michigan Volunteer Infantry, and served until July 16, 1865, with the rank of second lieutenant.

Political career
After the war, Aplin returned to Michigan and engaged in mercantile pursuits at Wenona (later West Bay City and now part of Bay City). He was postmaster of West Bay City from November 1869 to June 1886. He served as township clerk and township treasurer, each for three years and was a delegate to the 1884 Republican National Convention at Chicago.

Aplin was elected auditor general of the State in 1886 and 1888. He became interested in the construction of the electric railways of West Bay City and served as general manager until 1891. He was a member of the Michigan State House of Representatives in 1894 and 1895 and was again appointed postmaster of West Bay City, serving from October 1, 1898, to June 1902.

Due to the vacancy caused by the death of Rousseau O. Crump, Aplin was elected as a Republican from Michigan's 10th congressional district to the United States House of Representatives for the Fifty-seventh Congress. Aplin served from October 15, 1901 to March 3, 1903, and was an unsuccessful candidate for re-nomination in 1902, being defeated by fellow Republican George A. Loud.

After politics
After leaving Congress, Aplin engaged in agricultural pursuits and was also interested in the manufacture of ice.

Death
He died in Bay City on July 23, 1910, aged 69, and is interred there in Elm Lawn Cemetery.

References

 Retrieved on May 12, 2009
 The Political Graveyard

1841 births
1910 deaths
Burials in Michigan
Michigan Auditors General
Republican Party members of the Michigan House of Representatives
Politicians from Bay City, Michigan
Republican Party members of the United States House of Representatives from Michigan
People of Michigan in the American Civil War
Politicians from Flint, Michigan
19th-century American politicians